Neil Doolan (27 January 1933 – 22 December 2012) was an Australian rules footballer who played with North Melbourne in the Victorian Football League (VFL).

Doolan played as both a wingman and centreman during his career, first appearing for North Melbourne in the 1951 season. He played most of that year however in the reserves competition and won the Gardiner Medal for the league's best and fairest player. Doolan represented Victoria twice at interstate football.

References

External links

1933 births
2012 deaths
Australian rules footballers from Victoria (Australia)
North Melbourne Football Club players
Northcote Football Club coaches